David Houska (born 29 June 1993) is a Czech footballer  who currently plays for FK Jablonec as a midfielder. He has played in the Czech First League.

References

External links
 
 
 

1993 births
Living people
Czech footballers
Czech Republic youth international footballers
Czech Republic under-21 international footballers
Czech First League players
SK Sigma Olomouc players
Association football midfielders
Czech Republic international footballers
FK Jablonec players